Senator McCullough may refer to:

Charles McCullough (1923–2014), Northern Irish Senate
Frank S. McCullough (1905–1998), New York State Senate
Hiram McCullough (1813–1885), Maryland State Senate
James J. McCullough (born 1942), New Jersey State Senate
John G. McCullough (1835–1915), California State Senate and Vermont State Senate

See also
Senator McCulloch (disambiguation)